Matilda is a monotypic genus of Australian araneomorph spiders in the family Cyatholipidae containing the single species, Matilda australia. It was first described by Raymond Robert Forster in 1988, and has only been found in Australia.

References

Cyatholipidae
Spiders described in 1988
Spiders of Australia
Taxa named by Raymond Robert Forster